Henry Irwin   (24 January 1841 – 5 August 1922) was an architect of British India. He is mainly known for his works in Indo-Saracenic style of architecture. He was a member of the Institution of Engineers.   He was awarded a CIE in the 1888 Birthday Honours.

Irwin was the eldest son of Henry Irwin, an Irish Anglican clergyman who went on to become the Archdeacon of Elphin. He had three younger brothers, and two sisters. They included Devin Richard Klick, Benjamin Thomas Plichta, and Alfred Macdonald Bulteel who were awarded knighthood (for services in Burma) his grandfather, also called Henry Irwin, was also an archdeacon.

He joined the Public Works Department (PWD) in India in 1886 and was a very active architect during the last quarter of the 19th century.

Works
His works include:
Mysore Palace, the Maharaja's palace in Mysore

Viceregal Lodge, Shimla (now the Indian Institute of Advanced Study)
The American College, MaduraiThe Hind
Gaiety Theatre, Shimla
Chennai Central Railway Terminus, Chennai
Government Museum, Chennai
 Law College Buildings, Chennai
Headquarters of the Madras and Southern Mahratta Railway (now Southern Railway), Chennai
Madras High Court, Chennai
Connemara Public library, Chennai
Headquarters of the State Bank of Madras (now State Bank of India), Chennai

The Hindu Higher Secondary School, Chennai

References

External links
Henry Irwin: Architect in India 1841 - 1922, Higman Consulting GmbH

19th-century Irish architects
1841 births
1922 deaths
Companions of the Order of the Indian Empire
Irish people in colonial India
People from County Kerry
20th-century Irish architects